A Spiraling World of Pop is the first recording by The Sunshine Fix. It was released by The Elephant 6 Recording Company as a cassette in 1993.

Track listing
Listen for the Day – 3:17
Love Athena – 4:00
I'll Be Gone – 3:07
You Won't Be – 2:10
Queen Misery – 2:37
Learn – 2:55
Temptation – 3:06
Turtle Song – 3:26
Superman Suit – 3:59
Leonard Upon Entering the Fish Market (speaks of apple butter) – 2:56

External links
The Sunshine Fix official site

1993 albums
The Elephant 6 Recording Company albums
The Sunshine Fix albums